Altair Accelerator, previously known as NetworkComputer  (NC), is a commercial job scheduler developed by Altair Engineering.  The product was originally developed by Runtime Design Automation (RTDA) before Altair acquired the company.

Accelerator is used to manage a computer farm or computer cluster and is responsible for accepting, scheduling, dispatching, and managing the remote execution of standalone, parallel, or interactive user jobs. It also manages the allocation of resources such as processors, memory, disk space, software licenses, and custom objects to jobs that require them.

Accelerator uses a unique event-driven scheduler that results in very low overhead per job, usually in the millisecond range.

Features
 Web interface for administrators and users
 Native command execution and scripting support
 Job throttling based upon resource availability (CPU, RAM, licenses, etc.)

Accelerator runs on multiple platforms, including Linux, macOS, Microsoft Windows.

References
 Berkeley Presentation
 DeepChip post discussing NC
 EETimes article
 SOCcentral article

External links 
 Altair Engineering website

Job scheduling
Proprietary software